Dichostates is a genus of longhorn beetles of the subfamily Lamiinae.

 Dichostates ayresi Distant, 1898
 Dichostates biflavoplagiatus Lepesme & Breuning, 1952
 Dichostates camerunensis Breuning, 1954
 Dichostates compactus Fairmaire, 1887
 Dichostates concretus (Pascoe, 1857)
 Dichostates corticarius Hintz, 1910
 Dichostates depressus Báguena, 1952
 Dichostates flavoguttatus Hintz, 1912
 Dichostates flavopictus (Quedenfeldt, 1882)
 Dichostates hauseri Hintz, 1910
 Dichostates kuntzeni Hintz, 1912
 Dichostates lignarius (Guérin-Méneville, 1850)
 Dichostates lobatus Jordan, 1894
 Dichostates magnus Aurivillius, 1925
 Dichostates muelleri Quedenfeldt, 1888
 Dichostates nigroguttatus Jordan, 1894
 Dichostates obliquelineatus Breuning, 1942
 Dichostates occidentalis Breuning, 1954
 Dichostates partealbicollis Breuning, 1978
 Dichostates pygmaeus Téocchi, 2001
 Dichostates quadripunctatus (Chevrolat, 1855)
 Dichostates quadrisignatus Hintz, 1912
 Dichostates rougeoti Breuning, 1977
 Dichostates rubromaculatus Breuning, 1938
 Dichostates strandi Breuning, 1935
 Dichostates tabularis Kolbe, 1897
 Dichostates trifasciculatus Teocchi, Jiroux & Sudre, 2004
 Dichostates trilineatus Hintz, 1912
 Dichostates ugandae Breuning, 1935

References

Crossotini